Graham Alfred Withey (born 11 June 1960) is an English former professional footballer who played in the Football League as a forward.

References
Football League stats

General

1960 births
Living people
Footballers from Bristol
English footballers
Association football forwards
Welton Rovers F.C. players
Bath City F.C. players
Bristol Rovers F.C. players
Coventry City F.C. players
Seiko SA players
Cardiff City F.C. players
Bristol City F.C. players
Cheltenham Town F.C. players
Exeter City F.C. players
Brisbane City FC players
Weymouth F.C. players
Gloucester City A.F.C. players
Yate Town F.C. players
Weston-super-Mare A.F.C. players
Trowbridge Town F.C. players
English Football League players